Toxophacops is a genus of trilobites from the order Phacopida, family Phacopidae.  It is from the Devonian period and is very small compared to other genera in Phacopidae.

Species 
Toxophacops nonakai, Japan.

References 

Phacopidae
Devonian trilobites of Asia